Akpınar is a quarter of the city Bozüyük, Bozüyük District, Bilecik Province, Turkey. Its population is 494 (2021).

References

Bozüyük District